Parliamentary elections were held in the Trust Territory of the Pacific Islands on 8 November 1966.

Electoral system
The bicameral Congress consisted of a 12-member Senate with two members from each of the six districts and a 21-member House of Representatives with seats apportioned to each district based on their population – five from Truk, four from the Marshall Islands and Ponape, three from the Mariana Islands and Palau and two from Yap.

Elections were held every two years in November of even-numbered years, with all members of the House of Representatives and half the Senate (one member from each district) renewed at each election.

Results

Senate

House of Representatives

References

Trust Territory
1966 in the Trust Territory of the Pacific Islands
Elections in the Federated States of Micronesia
Elections in the Marshall Islands
Elections in Palau
Elections in the Northern Mariana Islands
November 1966 events in Oceania